Stephen Ronan, PC (13 April 1848 – 3 October 1925) was an Irish lawyer and judge. He was Irish Lord Justice of Appeal from 1915 to 1924.

References 

https://www.dib.ie/biography/ronan-stephen-a7787

1848 births
1925 deaths
Members of the King's Inns
Irish Queen's Counsel
Lords Justice of Appeal for Ireland
People from Cork (city)
Alumni of Queens College Cork
Members of the Inner Temple
English King's Counsel
Members of the Privy Council of Ireland
Irish atheists
Converts to Roman Catholicism from atheism or agnosticism